Dornburg-Camburg is a town in the Saale-Holzland district, in Thuringia, Germany. It was created on 1 December 2008, when the towns Dornburg and Camburg and the municipality Dorndorf-Steudnitz were merged.

History
Within the German Empire (1871-1918), Dornburg and Dorndorf-Steudnitz were part of the Grand Duchy of Saxe-Weimar-Eisenach, while Camburg was part of the Duchy of Saxe-Meiningen.

References

Saale-Holzland-Kreis
Grand Duchy of Saxe-Weimar-Eisenach
Duchy of Saxe-Meiningen